Quemedice is a genus of South American huntsman spiders that was first described by Cândido Firmino de Mello-Leitão in 1942.  it contains two species, found in Colombia, Argentina, and Brazil: Q. enigmaticus and Q. piracuruca. Originally placed with the Philodromidae, it was moved to the Sparassidae in 2008.

See also
 List of Sparassidae species

References

Araneomorphae genera
Sparassidae
Spiders of South America
Taxa named by Cândido Firmino de Mello-Leitão